Den Ouden is a Dutch surname meaning "the elder", as opposed to the much more common surname De Jong ("the younger"). In modern Dutch the description is de Oude. People with this name include:

Surname
Frits Jan Willem den Ouden (1914–2012), Dutch bomber pilot during World War II
Geert den Ouden (born 1978), Dutch footballer
Natasha den Ouden (born 1973), Dutch racing cyclist
Willy den Ouden (1918–1997), Dutch swimmer; 100-meter freestyle world record holder for 23 year

As a description
Artus Quellinus de Oude (1609–1668), Flemish Sculptor
Cornelis Evertsen de Oude (1610–1666), Dutch admiral
Jan de Oude (1536–1606), Count of Nassau-Dillenburg

See also
Den Oudsten, a Dutch coach builder and a surname meaning "the eldest"
Peter den Oudsten (born 1958), Labor Party politician

References

Dutch-language surnames